Oceaniopteris cartilaginea, synonym Blechnum cartilagineum, is known as the gristle fern or soft water fern. It is a resilient and abundant fern growing in eastern Australia, seen in rainforest and eucalyptus forest. The new growth is often pink or reddish in colour.

It is very tolerant of dry conditions once established in a shady area.

References

 Plant Net http://plantnet.rbgsyd.nsw.gov.au/cgi-bin/NSWfl.pl?page=nswfl&lvl=sp&name=Blechnum~cartilagineum Retrieved 8 September 2009

Blechnaceae
Flora of New South Wales
Flora of Queensland
Flora of Victoria (Australia)